Moterų Rankinio Klubas Žalgiris Kaunas is a Lithuanian women's handball club from Kaunas.

A founding member of the European Cup in 1961, Žalgiris won three editions in a row between 1967 and 1969 in addition to two Soviet Championships, which makes it one of the most successful Lithuanian teams in overall international competitions. However the team declined subsequently, with Spartak Kyiv dominating both competitions for nearly two decades. In 1979 Žalgiris made it into the championship's top three for the last time, with Egle Vilnius becoming the major Lithuanian team in the championship.

Since the break-up of the Soviet Union Žalgiris has played in the Lithuanian League.

Titles
 European Cup
 1967, 1968, 1969
 Soviet Championship
 1966, 1967
 Lithuanian League
2012, 2013, 2014, 2015, 2016, 2018

European record

References

Zalgiris handball
Zalgiris
Lithuanian Women's Handball League clubs